The Royal Palace of El Pardo is one of the official residences of the Spanish royal family and one of the oldest, being used by the Spanish monarchs since Enrique III in the 15th century. It is administered by the Patrimonio Nacional agency and it currently serves as a state guest house.

Overview
The palace began as a royal hunting lodge. It became an alternative residence of the kings of Spain until the reign of King Alfonso XII of Spain, who died in the palace in 1885.
 
King Enrique III of Castile ordered the building of the pavilion in 1406, on Mount El Pardo, because of its abundant game.  Later, in the time of Emperor Charles V (1547), it was transformed into a palace by the architect Luis de Vega.  On 13 March 1604, a massive fire destroyed many of the paintings it housed, including masterpieces by Titian. King Carlos III of Spain renovated the building in the 18th century, appointing his architect Francesco Sabatini to undertake the job.

The interior decoration includes a ceiling frescoed by Gaspar Becerra, and paintings by Vincenzo Carducci and Cabrera.

In 1739 the palace hosted talks between the governments of Britain and Spain, who eventually agreed to the Convention of Pardo in a bid to avert a war. However, the Convention failed to prevent war breaking out shortly afterwards.

Dictator Francisco Franco commandeered the palace as his residence after the Spanish Civil War and lived there until his death.

Access
Since Franco's death, the building has been used as a residence for visiting heads of state. When not in use by VIPs, it is open to the public. Objects on display include tapestries made by the Royal Tapestry Factory. Goya was one of the artists who designed tapestries for the palace with dimensions corresponding to specific locations in the building.

See also
Casita del Principe (El Pardo), related building for recreational use
Palace of Zarzuela, nearby royal residence
Ward of El Pardo

References

External links 

 Royal Palace of El Pardo on Patrimonio Nacional website

Houses completed in the 15th century
Palaces in Madrid
Royal residences in Spain
Bien de Interés Cultural landmarks in Madrid
Buildings and structures in Fuencarral-El Pardo District, Madrid
Francisco Franco
El Pardo
 State guesthouses